Gyula Czimra (3 January 1901 – 16 July 1966) was a Hungarian painter, with works in the collection of Hungarian National Gallery, the  Tornyai Museum of Hódmezővásárhely, the Rákospalota Museum and the Kiscell Museum.

References 

1901 births
1966 deaths
Artists from Budapest
20th-century Hungarian painters
Hungarian male painters
20th-century Hungarian male artists